Mickey Mouse is an American newspaper comic strip by the Walt Disney Company featuring Mickey Mouse, and is the first published example of Disney comics. The strip debuted on January 13, 1930, and ran until July 29, 1995. It was syndicated by King Features Syndicate.

The early installments were written by Walt Disney, with art by Ub Iwerks and Win Smith. Beginning with the May 5, 1930 strip, the art chores were taken up by Floyd Gottfredson (often aided by various inkers), who also either wrote or supervised the story continuities (relying on various writers to flesh out his plots). Gottfredson continued with the strip until 1975.

By 1931, the Mickey Mouse strip was published in 60 newspapers in the US, as well as papers in twenty other countries. Starting in 1940, strips were reprinted in the monthly comic book Walt Disney's Comics and Stories, and since then Gottfredson reprints have become a staple of Disney comics publishing around the world.

Walt Disney's Mickey Mouse, a definitive collection of Gottfredson's work, was published by Fantagraphics Books from 2011 to 2018. There are fourteen volumes in the set—twelve books of the daily strips from 1930 to 1955, and two volumes of Gottfredson's Sunday pages from 1932 to 1938.

Development

Early days
A Mickey Mouse comic strip was suggested by Joseph Connolly, the president of King Features Syndicate, in a July 24, 1929 letter to Disney animator Ub Iwerks: "I think your mouse animation is one of the funniest features I have ever seen in the movies. Please consider producing one in comic strip form for newspapers. If you can find time to do one, I shall be very interested in seeing some specimens." The Disney team was busy producing new cartoons, but by November, samples of the new strip were approved by the syndicate. The comic strip launched on January 13, 1930, written by Disney himself, with art by Ub Iwerks.

The strip begins with young Mickey as an optimistic, imaginative young mouse living on a farm, and dreaming of becoming a great aviator like his hero, Charles Lindbergh. In a sequence based on the 1928 short Plane Crazy, Mickey puts together a homemade plane, and takes a flight with his girlfriend Minnie. She falls out of the plane, and Mickey travels through a storm to land on a deserted island, inhabited by fierce natives who want to cook him alive.

As these first strips were being released in January 1930, Iwerks left the Disney studio, signing a contract with Disney competitor Pat Powers to leave Disney and start an animation studio under his own name. Win Smith, who had been inking the strips, took over the pencilling as well with the February 10th strip. Smith left the studio in April after a fight with Disney, who wanted him to take over writing the strip. As a "temporary replacement", Disney asked a young inbetweener at the studio named Floyd Gottfredson to fill in. Gottfredson's first strip was published on May 5, and he took over the scripting two weeks later. He would continue as the creative force of the strip for more than 45 years.

While the early months of the strip did have a loose plot, the pace and style were still the standard gag-a-day approach to comic strips. With adventure and daily continuity strips like The Gumps and Wash Tubbs becoming increasingly popular, King Features Syndicate asked Disney to make Mickey Mouse a more serious adventure strip.

This led to the first adventure storyline, "Mickey Mouse in Death Valley", which ran from April 1 to September 20, 1930. The story—begun by Smith, and continued by Gottfredson—involves a crooked lawyer, Sylvester Shyster, and his thuggish associate Peg-Leg Pete, who kidnap Minnie in order to find a map to her Uncle Mortimer's hidden gold mine in Death Valley. Mickey and Minnie race Shyster and Pete to the desert, to lay claim to the mine. The story runs through a number of Western melodrama tropes—a desperate horse chase, gunplay, a crusty old sheriff, the heroine getting locked up in a jail cell, the hero unfairly branded an outlaw. Over six months, Gottfredson made it clear that Mickey Mouse could deliver action and thrills.

The next story, "Mr. Slicker and the Egg Robbers", included a sequence in which Mickey, convinced that Minnie has thrown him over for a rival, spends a week trying (and failing) to commit suicide. He tries shooting, gassing, drowning and hanging himself, before he decides that he's overreacting and gives up on the idea.

1930s
In a 1931 publicity stunt, Mickey—just crowned boxing champion in the strip—had his  photograph taken, and then encouraged readers to send a stamped, addressed envelope to him care of the newspaper to get a copy. Gottfredson painted a "photo" that was printed on cards and sent out to the readers. According to a Disney press release, they received more than 20,000 requests for the picture, demonstrating the strength of the strip's appeal.

An early 1932 story, "The Great Orphanage Robbery", is seen as a milestone in Gottfredson's increasingly sophisticated storytelling. To raise money for an orphans' home, Mickey and friends stage a production of Uncle Tom's Cabin, but when the play is over, they discover that the money has been stolen. The thieves are Shyster and Pete, returning to the strip after a year and a half, but they manage to place the blame on Mickey's friend Horace Horsecollar, who's thrown in jail. Mickey chases after the villains, but his disappearance puts suspicion onto him as well. In the second volume of the 2011 reprint collection, comics historian Thomas Andrae describes the resulting storyline:

The first Sunday page appeared on January 10, 1932, and was aimed at a younger audience, as most Sunday comic strips were at the time. In September 1932, Mrs. Fieldmouse saddled Mickey with baby-sitting her two pesky twins, Morty and Ferdie, who kept his house in an uproar for two months' worth of strips. They called him "Unca' Mickey", although they didn't seem to be actual relations, but when they returned in March 1935 for another Sunday continuity, they were indeed Mickey's nephews.

Other memorable early-1930s storylines include 1932-33's "Blaggard Castle", in which Mickey and Horace are captured and hypnotized by the mad scientists Professor Ecks, Professor Doublex and Professor Triplex, and 1933's "The Mail Pilot", where Mickey finds Shyster and Pete once again, ruling a secret zeppelin kingdom in the clouds.

Mickey's best pal Goofy joined the strip in January 1933—still using the proto-Goofy moniker "Dippy Dawg"—and by the end of the year, he went into business with Mickey as detectives in "The Crazy Crime Wave", investigating the mysterious city-wide thefts of hair and red flannel underwear. The character appeared in several stories as Dippy, until January 1936, when he's called "Goofy" for the first time in the strip.

Donald Duck first appeared in the Sunday pages in February 1935, where he got Mickey involved in "The Case of the Missing Coats" and then stuck around to fight with Morty and Ferdie. In March 1935's "Editor-in-Grief", the brash duck was hired as a newsboy, selling Mickey's crusading newspaper, The Daily War-Drum.  He returned to the strip in fall 1936 for "The Seven Ghosts", helping Mickey and Goofy investigate a haunted mansion. This would be his last appearance in the Mickey Mouse strip—starting in August 1936, Donald was the star of a year-long sequence in the Sunday Silly Symphony comic strip, and he got his own comic strip in 1938. Since Mickey and Donald could appear in rival newspapers, the characters weren't allowed to cross over to the other's strip.

Another well-remembered 1930s story is Mickey Mouse Outwits the Phantom Blot, published from May to September 1939. In this story, Chief O'Hara hires Mickey to capture a new criminal who calls himself the Blot. According to O'Hara, he is the smartest thief they've ever met, but Detective Casey calls this new criminal a looney. The only thing he steals is cameras of a special type and he smashes them open on the spot. (The strange crime and the motive behind it resembles closely the Sherlock Holmes story "The Adventure of the Six Napoleons".) The crime appears eccentric, but the villain is deadly serious—three times during the story, he captures Mickey and leaves him in deadly peril, and the pair engage in a car chase, a boat chase and a battle for control of a crashing airplane. In the end, the Blot is captured and unmasked. The character was dubbed "the Phantom Blot" in 1941, when the strips were reprinted in Dell Comics' Four Color (1st series) issue #16, Mickey Mouse Outwits the Phantom Blot. The name stuck, and the character has been "the Phantom Blot" ever since.

In the Sunday pages from August to November 1938, Mickey performed in an adaptation of the current short cartoon Brave Little Tailor, bookended with segments showing him as an actor, being cast in the film by Walt Disney. This was Gottfredson's last work on the Sunday strip. At that point, Manuel Gonzales took over as the lead artist on the Mickey Sundays, and stayed in the post until 1981 (except for his military service during World War II, from 1942 to 1945). Gonzales and writer Merrill De Maris continued writing the occasional multi-week story, with an especially long four-month continuity from March to July 1940, "The Photographic Exhibition." The final Sunday story, "The Professor's Experiment", ran from November 1943 to March 1944. (This also happened to be the last appearance of Mickey's nephew Ferdie in the strip; from 1944 on, Ferdie's twin Morty always appeared alone.) At its peak the Sunday strip, "... appeared in 120 newspapers around the world with a collective circulation of more than 20 million readers each week."

1940s
Gottfredson stopped plotting the strip in June 1943, passing it on to Disney press agent Bill Walsh, who wrote the strip for the next twenty years. Walsh's first two stories were about fighting the Axis; the second one, Mickey Mouse on a Secret Mission, enraged Adolf Hitler so much that he demanded Benito Mussolini stop Italians from publishing the Topolino (Mickey Mouse) comic magazine.

As Walsh did not care much about Mickey Mouse as character, and had a taste for science-fiction, mystery and horror, his stories quickly diverged from the previous decade's. Walsh created various bizarre characters and made Mickey's antagonists darker and deadlier. In The 'Lectro Box (Oct 1943-Feb 1944), Mickey and nephew Morty create a powerful and unpredictable machine, which soon attracts the monstrous mad scientist Dr. Grut and his posse of mind-controlled Aberzombies. A few months later, Mickey, Minnie and Pluto visited The World of Tomorrow (July-Nov 1944), where Pegleg Pete ruled the world with his deadly robots, the Mekka Men. The next story, The House of Mystery (Nov 1944-Jan 1945), had the evil scientist Drusilla die in a fire as her mansion burns around her, and her caretaker rushes inside to be with her in the flames. At this point, the threat of death became a real presence in the strip.

In mid-1945, the daily strip moved to a mostly gag-a-day format, with brief two-week continuities through the summer of 1947. In September 1947, the strip returned to long continuities and introduced a new character: Eega Beeva, "the Man of Tomorrow".
 Eega was a strange creature from five hundred years in the future, a highly evolved human who understood future technology and possessed mysterious powers. He had a strange future accent that added a P to the beginning of most words: "I pdon't pthink so!" He was joined in February by his pet Pflip the Thnuckle-Booh, and became Mickey's sidekick for the next few years, returning to his home in the future in July 1950, at the end of "The Moook Treasure".

On a Sunday page in October 1949, Goofy  bought a talkative, self-centered mynah bird named Ellsworth. Also created by Walsh, Ellsworth was a major focus of the Sunday strip for ten years, sometimes crowding Mickey out of his own strip. He also appeared in the daily strip in 1956, once the dailies became gag-focused as well.

1950s and beyond
The daily strip took a darker turn in the early 1950s. Alberto Becattini says, "Especially after Eega Beeva left, Mickey found himself unwillingly mixed up in dangerous adventures whose development and outcome he no longer seemed to be able to control." Goofy, who had been fairly absent from the daily strip during Eega Beeva's tenure, returned to the strip in March 1951 with "Dry Gulch Goofy", a story in which he becomes a Hollywood actor.

In mid-1955, King Features Syndicate asked Gottfredson and Walsh to stop writing continuities and become a gag-a-day strip; they were concerned that TV serials were making the audience lose interest in adventure comic strips. Walsh continued to write the daily strip until 1964.

Notable supporting characters from the gag-a-day strip include Morty's friend Alvin (1956–75), his girlfriend Millie (1962–87), Doctor Proctor (1966-89), and Goofy's girlfriend Glory-Bee (1969–79), who also appeared in Disney comic books in the early 70s.

Creators

Gottfredson originally wrote and drew the Mickey Mouse strip by himself, but scaled back in 1932, only plotting the stories and doing the penciling, while the dialogue was mostly done by other hands. The stories were always untitled; titles were usually assigned later, when the strips were reprinted in picture books or comic books.  Scripts were written by Webb Smith (1932–33), Ted Osborne (1933–38), Merrill De Maris (1933–42), Dick Shaw (1942–43), Bill Walsh (1943–64), Roy Williams (1962-69) and Del Connell (1968–88). Even so, Gottfredson always worked closely with his writers, and would often suggest changes in the scripts whenever he thought it would improve a story. There were a variety of inkers on the strip through the years; inkers for the Sunday strips included Al Taliaferro (1932-1938) and Ted Thwaites (1932-1940), and Manuel Gonzales until 1981; Taliaferro also inked daily strips. Gottfredson returned to inking daily strips himself in February 1947; Frank Reilly took over as head of the Comic Strip Department, and Gottfredson had more time to devote to the strip.

Gottfredson plotted the continuities until Bill Walsh started writing the strip in 1943. Around that time, Dick Moores inked the strip for two years. Starting in the 1950s, Gottfredson and writer Bill Walsh were instructed to drop the storylines and do only daily gags. Gottfredson continued illustrating the daily strip until his retirement on October 1, 1975.

After Gottfredson retired, the strip was written by Del Connell (1968-1988), Floyd Norman (1984-1992) and Colette Bezio (1991-1995). Roman Arambula was the principal artist on the daily strip from 1975 to early 1990 (and even lettered it). Writer Mark Evanier described Arambula's work habits on the strip thus: "He would draw two weeks worth of the strip every other week and in the weeks he wasn't working on that, he drew comics for me."

Upon the retirement of Manuel Gonzales in 1981, Daan Jippes took over the Sunday strip (May 3, 1981 – January 3, 1982). Mike Royer provided most of the inking. From 1983 to 1990, Arambula took on the art chores of the Sunday strip in addition to the daily.

Arambula had occasional fill-in artists, "... which [he] would have told you was not because he ever missed a deadline". These included Manuel Gonzales (1975-1981), Tony Strobl (1975-1981), Steve Steere (1981-1982), Bill Wright (1982-1984), Bill Langley (1984-1987), Jules Coenen (1986-1987) and Larry Mayer (1986-1987). In the later years of the strip, art duties were shared by Alex Howell (1990-1995), Rick Hoover (1991-1995) and Thomas Lewis (1994-1995).

The Sunday page went into reprints in February 1992. By 1994, the strip was running in only 30 newspapers, and Disney and King Features decided to discontinue it. The daily strip ended on July 29, 1995.

Inspirations
The first two weeks of Mickey Mouse strips in 1930 were loosely based on the 1928 short Plane Crazy, followed by a sequence in the jungle, inspired by the 1929 short Jungle Rhythm. When Floyd Gottfredson took over, he also took inspiration from Disney's animation department, who provided him with storyboards and model sheets for upcoming Mickey Mouse shorts.

 "The Great Orphanage Robbery" (1932) was partly inspired by Mickey's Mellerdrammer (1933) and The Klondike Kid (1932), but with a more elaborate plot. 
 "Blaggard Castle" (1932–33) was inspired by The Mad Doctor (1933), and by Boris Karloff's character in the 1932 film The Old Dark House.
 "Mickey Mouse and His Horse Tanglefoot" (1933) was an adaptation of The Steeple Chase (1933).
 "Rumplewatt the Giant" (1934) was an adaptation of Giantland (1933).
 "The Captive Castaways" (1934) was inspired by Shanghaied (1934).
 "The Case of the Vanishing Coats" (1935) was inspired by The Invisible Man (1935), a never-finished cartoon.
 "Hoppy the Kangaroo" (1935) was based on Mickey's Kangaroo (1935).
 "Mickey's Rival" (1936) uses the antagonist Mortimer Mouse from the Mickey's Rival short (1936).
 "The Robin Hood Adventure" (1936) was partly inspired by Mickey's Garden (1935) and The Worm Turns (1937).
 "The Seven Ghosts" (1936) was inspired by a work-in-progress version of Lonesome Ghosts (1937); at the time that the comic was developed, the ghosts were mortal villains in costume, rather than actual ghosts as in the finished film.
 "Mighty Whale Hunter" (1938) was inspired by The Whalers (1938).
 "The Brave Little Tailor" (1938) is an explicit adaptation of the newly released short Brave Little Tailor (1938).
 "Society Dog Show" (1939) is an explicit adaptation of the newly released short Society Dog Show (1939).
 "Mickey Mouse Meets Robinson Crusoe" (1938–39) makes references to Mickey's Man Friday (1935).
 "Li'l Davy" (1955) features a diminutive version of Davy Crockett, following the popular Davy Crockett miniseries from the Disneyland TV show (1954–55).

Characters

Recurring characters in the strip include:
 Mickey Mouse: A young, bold, optimistic mouse, who loves excitement and adventure.
 Minnie Mouse: Mickey's girlfriend, a warm-hearted and stubborn mouse. Introduced in the first week of the strip, January 1930.
 Clarabelle Cow: Mickey and Minnie's talkative and stubborn friend. Introduced in "Mickey Mouse in Death Valley", April 1930.
 Horace Horsecollar: Mickey and Minnie's cheerful know-it-all friend. Introduced in "Mickey Mouse in Death Valley", April 1930.
 Pluto: Mickey's faithful dog. Introduced in "Pluto the Pup", July 1931.
 Goofy: Mickey's loyal, dimwitted best friend. Introduced as "Dippy Dog" in January 1933.
 Peg-Leg Pete: Mickey Mouse's nemesis, a tough gangster who often works with Sylvester Shyster. Introduced in "Mickey Mouse in Death Valley", April 1930.
 Sylvester Shyster: A sneaky lawyer behind a number of villainous schemes. Introduced in "Mickey Mouse in Death Valley", April 1930.
 The Phantom Blot: A nefarious hooded villain who first appeared in "Mickey Mouse Outwits the Phantom Blot" in May 1939. The mysterious Blot never returned in Gottfredson's strip, but the character has resurfaced many times over the years, starting with a 1955 story in the Italian Topolino, a 1964 three-part serial in Walt Disney's Comics and Stories, and then his own comic, published by Gold Key Comics for 7 issues from 1964 to 1966.
 Butch: A roughneck who started as a gangster in "Mr. Slicker and the Egg Robbers" in November 1930, but stuck around and became Mickey's pal for a year, exiting the strip after "Circus Roustabout" in June 1931. The character was revived in the 1990s as a member of Mickey's supporting cast in European Disney comics.
 Professors Ecks, Doublex and Triplex: Three terrifying mad scientists who first menaced Mickey Mouse in "Blaggard Castle", November 1932 to February 1933. The  professors returned as "reformed"  characters in Italian comics in the 1970s, and came back to the Mickey Mouse strip as villains in the June 1990 story "The Time Transmuter".
 Tanglefoot: Mickey's broken-down but loyal horse. Introduced in "Mickey Mouse and His Horse Tanglefoot", June 1933. The horse character returned in two more stories -- "The Crazy Crime Wave" and "Tanglefoot Pulls His Weight"—and was so popular that Western Publishing released six Big Little Books in 1934 related to Tanglefoot.

From the beginning, the strips were parts of long continuing stories. These introduced characters such as the Phantom Blot, Eega Beeva, and the Bat Bandit, which Gottfredson created; Disney created Eli Squinch, Mickey's nephews, Morty and Ferdie Fieldmouse, and Sylvester Shyster, which were also introduced in the comic.

Storylines
Mickey Mouse had adventure storylines from its inception until October 1955, when the syndicate instructed the creators to move to a simpler, gag-a-day format. In 1990, the daily strip returned to the adventure format.

Daily strips (1930–1955)
The headings in the table below refer to the Fantagraphics Books reprint collections, Walt Disney's Mickey Mouse.

Daily strips (1990–1995)
In 1990, writer Floyd Norman convinced King Features Syndicate to allow him to bring back the comic strip's adventure story format. Norman and Colette Bezio shared the scripting, with Rick Hoover, Alex Howell and Thomas Lewis providing art. The 1990-1995 stories have not been reprinted in the US, and only rarely in other countries.

List of storylines:

 Crossbone Island (Jan 15-Feb 10, 1990)
 The Time Transmuter (June 4-June 23, 1990)
 The Rock Monsters (June 25-July 14, 1990)
 The Zombie Plot (July 23-Aug 11, 1990)
 The Sand Spirit (Sept 10–29, 1990)
 The Grizzly Oil Spill (Oct 29-Nov 17, 1990)
 Fattening Fudge (Nov 19-Dec 8, 1990)
 The Spacemen (Dec 17, 1990-Jan 5, 1991)
 Deadman's Cave (Jan 7-26, 1991)
 The Mad Dentist (Feb 4-23, 1991)
 Artificial Earthquakes (April 1–20, 1991)
 The Ghost of J.P. Mudd (April 29-May 18, 1991)
 The Dumpin' of Toxic Waste (May 27-June 15, 1991)
 The Evil Vampire Count Blotula (June 24-July 13, 1991)
 Dr. Gloom (July 22-Aug 10, 1991)
 Minnie's Airplane (Aug 19-Sept 7, 1991)
 Melting of the Polar Ice Cap (Sept 16-Oct 5, 1991)
 The Jungle Survival Trip (Oct 1-Nov 2, 1991)
 Climbing the Splatterhorn (Nov 25-Dec 14, 1991)
 The Car Race (Dec 30, 1991-Jan 18, 1992)
 Goofy the Baseball Player (Jan 20-Feb 8, 1992)
 Goofy's Flea Circus (Feb 17-March 7, 1992)
 Photographing Bigfoot (March 16-April 4, 1992)
 The Highway Robber (April 13-May 2, 1992)

 Dinosaurs in the Jungle (May 11–30, 1992) 
 Pete's Health Club (June 8–27, 1992) 
 Theatrical Sabotage (July 6–25, 1992) 
 The Metalligent (Aug 24-Sept 19, 1992)
 The Haunted Road Tunnel (Sept 28-Oct 17, 1992) 
 The Pancake Baking Contest (Nov 2-21, 1992) 
 The Castaways (Dec 7-26, 1992) 
 The Art Vandal (Jan 18-Feb 6, 1992)
 Dr. Goofy Doolittle (March 1–27, 1993) 
 Professor Goofy (Apr 26-May 22, 1993)
 The Tough Guy Contest (Sept 6-25, 1993)
 The Mole People Robbers (Nov 1-20, 1993)
 Blaggard Castle (remake) (Jan 24-Feb 19, 1994)
 A Matter of Gravity (Feb 21-March 12, 1994)
 Mickey Mouse Outwits the Phantom Blot (remake) (March 14-April 9, 1994)
 Captain Blight's Sunken Treasure (April 11–30, 1994)
 The Gold Panning Trip on Mt. Baldy (May 2–21, 1994)
 The Treasure of Um-Tut-Sut (May 23-June 11, 1994)
 The Mail Pilot (remake) (June 13-July 9, 1994)
 Pluto Gets Lost (Aug 8-Sept 3, 1994)
 Ecks and Doublex Reform, aka Reform and Void (Dec 26-Jan 14, 1995)
 Goofy's Mythical Lion-Dog (Jan 16-Feb 11, 1995)
 Adventurous Ice-Fishing (May 8-June 3, 1995)
 Mickey & Goofy in Itsybitsia (July 3–29, 1995)

Sunday strips

The two volumes of Walt Disney's Mickey Mouse reprint the Sunday pages that Gottfredson worked on. Following the Brave Little Tailor adaptation in 1938, Manuel Gonzales took over as artist for the Sunday pages until 1942, when it passed to Bill Wright. There were seven more Sunday storylines under Gonzales and Wright's tenure:

 "The Society Dog Show" (January 15–22, 1939), written by Merrill De Maris, pencil by Manuel Gonzales, inks by Ted Thwaites
 "The Photographic Expedition" (March 17-July 14, 1940), written by Merrill De Maris, pencil by Manuel Gonzales, inks by Ted Thwaites
 "Purty Clever" (Jan 19-Feb 16, 1941), written by Merrill De Maris, pencil and inks by Manuel Gonzales
 "Goofy Gets Smart" (May 18-June 22, 1941), written by Merrill De Maris, pencil and inks by Manuel Gonzales
 "Lucky Mickey" (aka No Charge!) (Sept 7-21, 1941), written by Merrill De Maris, pencil and inks by Manuel Gonzales
 no title (Sept 19-Nov 14, 1943), written by Hubie Karp, pencil and inks by Bill Wright
 "The Professor's Experiment" (Nov 21, 1943-March 12, 1944), written by Hubie Karp, pencil and inks by Bill Wright

Following "The Professor's Experiment", the Sunday strip shifted completely to the gag-a-week format.

The Perils of Mickey
In 1993–1994, the Disney Company began a branding campaign called "The Perils of Mickey", evoking the spirit of Gottfredson's early-30s Mickey comics. The campaign involved "remakes" of three classic Gottfredson stories in the daily newspaper strip: "Blaggard Castle" (Jan-Feb 1994), "Mickey Mouse Outwits the Phantom Blot" (March–April) and "The Mail Pilot" (June–July). All three were drawn by Rick Hoover.

Merchandise for the campaign often used the "pie-eyed" Mickey design, and included keychains and storybooks published by Golden Press.

"Perils of Mickey" comics also appeared in the Disney Adventures magazine, including "Return to Blaggard Castle", an adventure featuring Mickey, Minnie, Horace and the Phantom Blot, published in Vol. 3 Nos. 10-11 (1993).

Reprints and collections

Big Little Books
In the 1930s and 40s, Western Publishing published a very popular series of small hardcover books for children known as Big Little Books. These chunky, compact books featured a captioned illustration on one page, with a page of text on the facing page. The stories featured a wide assortment of popular characters, including a number of Disney stars, and Gottfredson's Mickey Mouse strips provided the perfect material for an illustrated adventure story.

The following Big Little Books were published based on Mickey Mouse storylines:

 Mickey Mouse (1933), based on Mickey Mouse and the Gypsies aka Mickey Mouse and the Ransom Plot 
 Mickey Mouse Sails for Treasure Island (1933), based on Mickey Mouse Sails for Treasure Island
 Mickey Mouse the Mail Pilot (1933), based on The Mail Pilot
 Mickey Mouse in the Blaggard Castle (1934), based on Blaggard Castle
 Mickey Mouse the Detective (1934), based on The Crazy Crime Wave
 Mickey Mouse and Bobo the Elephant (1935), based on Bobo the Elephant 
 Mickey Mouse and the Bat Bandit (1935), based on The Bat Bandit of Inferno Gulch 
 Mickey Mouse and Pluto the Racer (1936), based on Pluto the Racer 
 Mickey Mouse and the Sacred Jewel (1936), based on The Sacred Jewel
 Mickey Mouse Runs His Own Newspaper (1937), based on Editor-in-Grief
 Mickey Mouse in the Race for Riches (1938), based on Race for Riches
 Mickey Mouse and the Pirate Submarine (1939), based on The Pirate Submarine
 Mickey Mouse and the Seven Ghosts (1940), based on The Seven Ghosts

 Mickey Mouse in the Foreign Legion (1940), based on Mickey Mouse Joins the Foreign Legion
 Mickey Mouse in the Treasure Hunt (1941), based on In Search of Jungle Treasure
 Mickey Mouse on Sky Island (1941), based on Sky Island
 Mickey Mouse and the Magic Lamp (1942), based on The Miracle Master
 Mickey Mouse and the Dude Ranch Bandit (1943), based on The Bar-None Ranch 
 Mickey Mouse on the Cave-man Island (1944), based on Land of Long Ago
 Mickey Mouse, Bellboy Detective (1945), based on Bellhop Detective
 Mickey Mouse and the 'Lectro Box (1946), based on The 'Lectro Box
 Mickey Mouse and the Lazy Daisy Mystery (1947), based on Billy the Mouse 
 Mickey Mouse and the Desert Palace (1948), based on ??
 Mickey Mouse in the World of Tomorrow (1948), based on The World of Tomorrow
 Mickey Mouse and the Stolen Jewels (1949), based on ??

There was also a set of six "Wee Little Books" published in 1934—smaller books released in a special box set that told the story of Mickey Mouse and His Horse Tanglefoot. The six titles are Mickey Mouse at the Carnival, Mickey Mouse's Misfortune, Mickey Mouse and Tanglefoot, Mickey Mouse's Uphill Fight, Mickey Mouse Will Not Quit and Mickey Mouse Wins the Race.

Comic books

Gottfredson's Mickey strips were often collected in the 1930s and 1940s. The monthly Mickey Mouse Magazine began reprinting Mickey Mouse strips in issue #16 (January 1937), which continued after the magazine evolved into Dell Publishing's Walt Disney's Comics and Stories in 1940. The title continued reprinting Mickey Mouse through 1948.

Modern-day American reprints began with "The Bar None Ranch" (1940) which appeared in Walt Disney Comics Digest #40 (1973). The following year "The Bat Bandit" (1934) appeared in a deluxe edition The Best of Walt Disney Comics. Abbeville Press' large size Best Comics anthologies in the late-1970s included two all-Gottfredson volumes (one headlined "Goofy"), though the stories were relettered and sometimes condensed. In 1980, Abbeville issued a small-size Best Comics series that included three all-Gottfredson volumes (again, one headlined "Goofy"), all of which reprinted stories from the earlier large-size editions.

Another Rainbow Publishing

In 1986, Another Rainbow/Gladstone Publishing (and later Gemstone Publishing) began a tradition of serializing Gottfredson stories in regular Disney monthly comic books, which continued on and off until 2008, when they ceased publication. Gladstone also collected a number of Gottfredson's serials in the larger-size "comic albums" it issued during the 1980s;, in 1990, Disney Comics issued "Mickey Mouse Outwits the Phantom Blot" (1939) in the same format.

In 1988 a selection of both the daily and Sunday strip were published by Another Rainbow Publishing in the book Mickey Mouse in Color.

Gemstone Publishing

In 2006, Gemstone Publishing published a colored and reformatted version of the story "Mickey Mouse Music" for the Walt Disney Treasures collection Disney Comics: 75 Years of Innovation.

Gemstone then went on to publish numerous Gottfredson stories in issues of Walt Disney's Comics and Stories, including "Mickey Mouse Joins the Foreign Legion," "Pflip's Strange Power," and "The Gleam."

Gemstone also announced The Floyd Gottfredson Library, a comprehensive edition of Gottfredson's serialized stories (Mickey 1930–1955, plus later non-Mickey material) with a planned release during 2009. But the series was postponed, then canceled once Gemstone no longer had the Disney license.

Fantagraphics

In 2011, Fantagraphics resumed production of the series Gemstone had started, with the same editorial team but with the individual books branded "Walt Disney's Mickey Mouse." The Floyd Gottfredson Library series title appeared on the indicia pages inside the books.

Fantagraphics' Gottfredson Library came into print in 2011 and its publishing run lasted until 2018; in total 14 volumes were released, collecting the Gottfredson Mickey Mouse daily strips originally published from 1930 to 1955 as well as the various works Gottfredson did for the Mickey Mouse and Walt Disney's Treasury of Classic Tales Sunday strips.

On November 21, 2018, Fantagraphics followed the Gottfredson Library with a one-shot anthology book to celebrate Mickey Mouse's 90th anniversary, titled Mickey Mouse: The Greatest Adventures, ISBN:. This book featured black-and-white daily strips newly arranged and printed in full color, in a 300-page "best-of" selection that included "Mickey Mouse in Death Valley" and "The Gleam" among others.

See also
 Disney comics
 Donald Duck (comic strip)
 Walt Disney's Mickey Mouse, 2011–18 reprint collection of Floyd Gottfredson's run

References

External links
 Mickey Mouse daily strips at the INDUCKS
 Mickey Mouse Sunday strips at the INDUCKS

1930 comics debuts
1995 comics endings
1930 establishments in the United States
1995 disestablishments in the United States
Disney comic strips
Mickey Mouse comics
American comic strips
Adventure comic strips
Humor comics